In the general theory of relativity, the Einstein field equations (EFE; also known as Einstein's equations) relate the geometry of spacetime to the distribution of matter within it.

The equations were published by Einstein in 1915 in the form of a tensor equation which related the local  (expressed by the Einstein tensor) with the local energy, momentum and stress within that spacetime (expressed by the stress–energy tensor).

Analogously to the way that electromagnetic fields are related to the distribution of charges and currents via Maxwell's equations, the EFE relate the spacetime geometry to the distribution of mass–energy, momentum and stress, that is, they determine the metric tensor of spacetime for a given arrangement of stress–energy–momentum in the spacetime. The relationship between the metric tensor and the Einstein tensor allows the EFE to be written as a set of nonlinear partial differential equations when used in this way. The solutions of the EFE are the components of the metric tensor. The inertial trajectories of particles and radiation (geodesics) in the resulting geometry are then calculated using the geodesic equation.

As well as implying local energy–momentum conservation, the EFE reduce to Newton's law of gravitation in the limit of a weak gravitational field and velocities that are much less than the speed of light.

Exact solutions for the EFE can only be found under simplifying assumptions such as symmetry. Special classes of exact solutions are most often studied since they model many gravitational phenomena, such as rotating black holes and the expanding universe. Further simplification is achieved in approximating the spacetime as having only small deviations from flat spacetime, leading to the linearized EFE. These equations are used to study phenomena such as gravitational waves.

Mathematical form

The Einstein field equations (EFE) may be written in the form:

The Einstein tensor is defined as

This is a symmetric second-degree tensor that depends on only the metric tensor and its first and second derivatives.

The Einstein gravitational constant is defined as

The EFE can thus also be written as

In standard units, each term on the left has units of 1/length2.

The expression on the left represents the curvature of spacetime as determined by the metric; the expression on the right represents the stress–energy–momentum content of spacetime. The EFE can then be interpreted as a set of equations dictating how stress–energy–momentum determines the curvature of spacetime.

These equations, together with the geodesic equation, which dictates how freely falling matter moves through spacetime, form the core of the mathematical formulation of general relativity.

The EFE is a tensor equation relating a set of symmetric 4 × 4 tensors. Each tensor has 10 independent components. The four Bianchi identities reduce the number of independent equations from 10 to 6, leaving the metric with four gauge-fixing degrees of freedom, which correspond to the freedom to choose a coordinate system.

Although the Einstein field equations were initially formulated in the context of a four-dimensional theory, some theorists have explored their consequences in  dimensions. The equations in contexts outside of general relativity are still referred to as the Einstein field equations. The vacuum field equations (obtained when  is everywhere zero) define Einstein manifolds.

The equations are more complex than they appear. Given a specified distribution of matter and energy in the form of a stress–energy tensor, the EFE are understood to be equations for the metric tensor , since both the Ricci tensor and scalar curvature depend on the metric in a complicated nonlinear manner. When fully written out, the EFE are a system of ten coupled, nonlinear, hyperbolic-elliptic partial differential equations.

Sign convention
The above form of the EFE is the standard established by Misner, Thorne, and Wheeler (MTW). The authors analyzed conventions that exist and classified these according to three signs ([S1] [S2] [S3]):

The third sign above is related to the choice of convention for the Ricci tensor:

Authors including Einstein have used a different sign in their definition for the Ricci tensor which results in the sign of the constant on the right side being negative:

The sign of the cosmological term would change in both these versions if the  metric sign convention is used rather than the MTW  metric sign convention adopted here.

Equivalent formulations
Taking the trace with respect to the metric of both sides of the EFE one gets

where  is the spacetime dimension.

In  dimensions this reduces to

Reversing the trace again would restore the original EFE. The trace-reversed form may be more convenient in some cases (for example, when one is interested in weak-field limit and can replace  in the expression on the right with the Minkowski metric without significant loss of accuracy).

The cosmological constant

In the Einstein field equations

the term containing the cosmological constant  was absent from the version in which he originally published them.  Einstein then included the term with the cosmological constant to allow for a universe that is not expanding or contracting. This effort was unsuccessful because:
 any desired steady state solution described by this equation is unstable, and
 observations by Edwin Hubble showed that our universe is expanding.

Einstein then abandoned , remarking to George Gamow "that the introduction of the cosmological term was the biggest blunder of his life".

The inclusion of this term does not create inconsistencies. For many years the cosmological constant was almost universally assumed to be zero. The cosmological constant is negligible at the scale of a galaxy or smaller.

Einstein thought of the cosmological constant as an independent parameter, but its term in the field equation can also be moved algebraically to the other side and incorporated as part of the stress–energy tensor:

This tensor describes a vacuum state with an energy density  and isotropic pressure  that are fixed constants and given by

The existence of a cosmological constant is thus equivalent to the existence of a vacuum energy and a pressure of opposite sign. This has led to the terms "cosmological constant" and "vacuum energy" being used interchangeably in general relativity.

Features

Conservation of energy and momentum
General relativity is consistent with the local conservation of energy and momentum expressed as

which expresses the local conservation of stress–energy. This conservation law is a physical requirement. With his field equations Einstein ensured that general relativity is consistent with this conservation condition.

Nonlinearity

The nonlinearity of the EFE distinguishes general relativity from many other fundamental physical theories. For example, Maxwell's equations of electromagnetism are linear in the electric and magnetic fields, and charge and current distributions (i.e. the sum of two solutions is also a solution); another example is Schrödinger's equation of quantum mechanics, which is linear in the wavefunction.

The correspondence principle
The EFE reduce to Newton's law of gravity by using both the weak-field approximation and the slow-motion approximation. In fact, the constant  appearing in the EFE is determined by making these two approximations.

Vacuum field equations

If the energy–momentum tensor  is zero in the region under consideration, then the field equations are also referred to as the vacuum field equations. By setting  in the trace-reversed field equations, the vacuum equations can be written as

In the case of nonzero cosmological constant, the equations are

The solutions to the vacuum field equations are called vacuum solutions. Flat Minkowski space is the simplest example of a vacuum solution. Nontrivial examples include the Schwarzschild solution and the Kerr solution.

Manifolds with a vanishing Ricci tensor, are referred to as Ricci-flat manifolds and manifolds with a Ricci tensor proportional to the metric as Einstein manifolds.

Einstein–Maxwell equations

If the energy–momentum tensor  is that of an electromagnetic field in free space, i.e. if the electromagnetic stress–energy tensor

is used, then the Einstein field equations are called the Einstein–Maxwell equations (with cosmological constant , taken to be zero in conventional relativity theory):

Additionally, the covariant Maxwell equations are also applicable in free space:

where the semicolon represents a covariant derivative, and the brackets denote anti-symmetrization. The first equation asserts that the 4-divergence of the 2-form  is zero, and the second that its exterior derivative is zero. From the latter, it follows by the Poincaré lemma that in a coordinate chart it is possible to introduce an electromagnetic field potential  such that

in which the comma denotes a partial derivative. This is often taken as equivalent to the covariant Maxwell equation from which it is derived. However, there are global solutions of the equation that may lack a globally defined potential.

Solutions

The solutions of the Einstein field equations are metrics of spacetime. These metrics describe the structure of the spacetime including the inertial motion of objects in the spacetime. As the field equations are non-linear, they cannot always be completely solved (i.e. without making approximations). For example, there is no known complete solution for a spacetime with two massive bodies in it (which is a theoretical model of a binary star system, for example). However, approximations are usually made in these cases. These are commonly referred to as post-Newtonian approximations. Even so, there are several cases where the field equations have been solved completely, and those are called exact solutions.

The study of exact solutions of Einstein's field equations is one of the activities of cosmology. It leads to the prediction of black holes and to different models of evolution of the universe.

One can also discover new solutions of the Einstein field equations via the method of orthonormal frames as pioneered by Ellis and MacCallum. In this approach, the Einstein field equations are reduced to a set of coupled, nonlinear, ordinary differential equations. As discussed by Hsu and Wainwright, self-similar solutions to the Einstein field equations are fixed points of the resulting dynamical system. New solutions have been discovered using these methods by LeBlanc and Kohli and Haslam.

The linearized EFE

The nonlinearity of the EFE makes finding exact solutions difficult. One way of solving the field equations is to make an approximation, namely, that far from the source(s) of gravitating matter, the gravitational field is very weak and the spacetime approximates that of Minkowski space. The metric is then written as the sum of the Minkowski metric and a term representing the deviation of the true metric from the Minkowski metric, ignoring higher-power terms. This linearization procedure can be used to investigate the phenomena of gravitational radiation.

Polynomial form
Despite the EFE as written containing the inverse of the metric tensor, they can be arranged in a form that contains the metric tensor in polynomial form and without its inverse. First, the determinant of the metric in 4 dimensions can be written

using the Levi-Civita symbol; and the inverse of the metric in 4 dimensions can be written as:

The action from which the equations are derived can also be written in polynomial form by suitable redefinitions of the fields.

See also

Conformastatic spacetimes
Einstein–Hilbert action
Equivalence principle
Exact solutions in general relativity
General relativity resources
History of general relativity
Hamilton–Jacobi–Einstein equation
Mathematics of general relativity
Numerical relativity
Ricci calculus

Notes

References
See General relativity resources.

External links

 
 Caltech Tutorial on Relativity — A simple introduction to Einstein's Field Equations.
 The Meaning of Einstein's Equation — An explanation of Einstein's field equation, its derivation, and some of its consequences
Video Lecture on Einstein's Field Equations by MIT Physics Professor Edmund Bertschinger.
Arch and scaffold: How Einstein found his field equations Physics Today November 2015, History of the Development of the Field Equations

External images
The Einstein field equation on the wall of the Museum Boerhaave in downtown Leiden
Suzanne Imber, "The impact of general relativity on the Atacama Desert", Einstein field equation on the side of a train in Bolivia.

Albert Einstein
Equations of physics
General relativity
Partial differential equations